Schemamonk Constantine Cavarnos (1918, Boston – March 3, 2011, Florence, Arizona) was an American philosopher, Byzantinist, and Eastern Orthodox monk.

Early life and education
Cavarnos was born in Boston in 1918.

He graduated from Harvard University in 1948 with a doctorate in philosophy.

Career
Cavarnos taught philosophy at Tufts University, the University of North Carolina, and Wheaton College. In 1956, he founded and became director of the Institute for Byzantine and Modern Greek Studies (IBMGS) in Belmont, Massachusetts. In 1978, he joined Hellenic College Holy Cross Greek Orthodox School of Theology in Brookline, Massachusetts, as a professor of philosophy, later becaming professor of Byzantine art. He has also lectured at various Orthodox seminaries.

He died on March 3, 2011, at St. Anthony's Greek Orthodox Monastery in Florence, Arizona.

Publications
Cavarnos has written almost 100 books and various papers on philosophy, theology, history, among other topics.

His 15-volume Modern Orthodox Saints series consists of the following titles.

St. Cosmas Aitolos.
St. Macarios of Corinth.
St. Nicodemos the Hagiorite.
St. Nikephoros of Chios.
St. Seraphim of Sarov.
St. Arsenios of Paros.
St. Nectarios of Aegina.
St. Savvas the New.
St. Methodia of Kimolos.
Saints Raphael, Nicholas and Irene of Lesvos.
Blessed Elder Philotheos Zervakos.
Blessed Hermit Philaretos of the Holy Mountain.
Blessed Elder Gabriel Dionysiatis.
Blessed Elder Iakovos of Epiros, Elder Joseph the Hesychast, and Mother Stavritsa the Missionary.
St. Athanasios Parios.

His various books include the following, organized by topic.

Art, music, and iconography:

 
 
 
 
 
 
 
 
 
 
 
 

Ancient philosophy:

 
 
 
 
 
 
 
 
 
 

Modern Greek studies:

 
 
 
 
 
 

Lives of saints:

 
 
 

Monasticism:

 
 

Collected works:

  (2009 reprint)

Theology and spirituality:

Further reading

References

External links
Institute for Byzantine and Modern Greek Studies (IBMGS)

1918 births
2011 deaths
Writers from Boston
Clergy from Boston
Eastern Orthodox monks
Eastern Orthodox writers
American people of Greek descent
Harvard University alumni
American Byzantinists